The Aston Martin DB6 is a grand tourer made by British car manufacturer Aston Martin and was produced from September 1965 to January 1971. ( "DB" designation from (Sir) David Brown who built up the company from 1947 onwards) 

The DB6 succeeded the Aston Martin DB5 and featured improved aerodynamics and specification over its predecessor.

History and design
After Aston Martin rejected proposals for a replacement for its DB5 from the original DB4 Touring of Milan, the decision was made to focus on their own development car, registered 4 YMC. Wind tunnel testing, begun in February 1965, showed development was necessary to counteract a tendency toward aerodynamic lift [a result of the fastback styling] causing reduced rear-wheel traction at high speed. Final development phases relied upon DB5 chassis, suitably lengthened and titled MP 219, with rear lip-spoiler and abbreviated Kammback tail Aston Martin previously incorporated in sports-racing prototypes. The decision was made to produce MP 219 as the Aston Martin DB6 although the prototype de Dion rear axle was rejected, Aston's soldiering on with its live-axle configuration reducing time to market, cost and complexity.

Introduced at the 1965 London Motor Show, the DB6 was already a dated design notable as the first model engineered following a factory relocation from Feltham to Newport Pagnell. The DB6 has a resemblance to its predecessor, the DB5; with the most noticeable differences being its wheelbase, side profile, split front and rear bumpers and rear panels incorporating the Kammback tail rear end. The tail, combined with the relocated rear-axle and the  lengthened wheelbase, provide more stability at high speed. Though fashionable – the rear-end Kamm-styled design was similar to the Ferrari 250 – it did not prove popular with conservative, tradition oriented Aston clientele when the DB6 was introduced.

The DB6 continued with then high-tech Armstrong Selectaride cockpit-adjustable rear shock absorbers as available on the DB5. Other highlights include adopting front-door quarter windows, an oil-cooler air scoop low on the front valance, quarter-bumpers at each corner, revised tail-lamp clusters; additionally the spoiler affected the overall proportions of the DB6, with an increase in length by approximately two inches.

Other notable changes:
Roof line raised by two inches improving headroom especially for rear seat passengers
Genuinely useful leg room for rear passengers
More steeply raked albeit taller windscreen
Split front and rear bumpers
Standard chrome wire wheels on bias-ply whitewall tyres [in USA market]
Optional power steering
Optional air conditioning
Standard ZF five-speed manual unit or a BorgWarner three-speed automatic gearbox available at no extra cost
Optional Vantage specification retaining triple side-draft Weber 45DCOE carburetors with other minor revisions raising quoted output to 325 hp

Another major change from the DB5 to DB6 was abandonment of the full superleggera construction technique patented by coachbuilders/stylist Touring of Milan. For later DB6's construction, the more common body-on-platform technique was used; this was primarily due to the extended rear requiring a stronger and more rigid design utilizing a folded sheet metal supporting structure. Surprisingly the modifications combined to add only seventeen pounds weight compared to the DB5.

Specifications

The DB6 is powered by the  twin-overhead camshaft (DOHC), in-line six-cylinder Aston Martin engine designed by Tadek Marek. Although the DB6 was approximately  heavier than its predecessor, the stability at high speed, added luggage capacity and comforts for passengers in this grand tourer more than offset any imperceptible loss in performance caused by additional weight. The rear suspension used helical coil springs with ride control that was adjustable from inside the car.

Curb weight: 
Engine: 4.0 L straight-6
Compression ratio: standard=8.9:1 ; Vantage=9.4:1
Power:  at 5500 rpm (standard engine)
Power:  at 5750 rpm (optional Vantage engine)
Torque:  at 4500 rpm
Top Speed: 
0–60 mph (97 km/h) Acceleration: 8.4 s
Steering: rack and pinion with optional power assist
Fuel tank capacity: 19 imp gallons (standard) 16 imp gallons (with optional air conditioning fitted)

Later models and variants

The DB6 Mark II was announced on 21 August 1969, identified by distinct flares on front and rear wheel arches and wider tyres on 1/2" wider wheels. Available as an optional extra for the Mark II was AE Brico electronic fuel-injection combined with the higher compression ratio cylinder head. The Mark II edition shared many parts with the then-new DBS.

As with previous Aston Martin models, a high-power DB6 Vantage was offered. It was equipped with three Weber carburetors and higher compression ratio cylinder head.

A convertible body style was also offered, named the Volante. This was introduced at the 1966 London Motor Show. The DB6-based Volante succeeded the earlier (1965–1966) Volantes which were built on the last of the DB5 chassis' and were known as "short chassis" Volantes. Of the later DB6-based Volantes just 140 were built, including 29 high-output Vantage Volante versions, highly prized by collectors.

Charles III, owns a DB6-based Volante MkII that has been converted to run on E85. The car was given to him by his mother on his 21st birthday.

Shooting Brake
A total of six or seven DB6 Shooting-brakes were produced by British coachbuilder Harold Radford, with three more by FLM Panelcraft The engine options (282 and 325 hp) were the same as for the DB6 Saloon.
Kerb weight: 
Overall length: 
Overall width:  
Height:  
Turning radius: 34 feet
Wheelbase:  
Track:  (f)(r)
Fuel tank capacity: 
One of the Radford-built DB6 Shooting Brakes was the 1967 New York Auto Show car. The car was Roman Purple over Natural hide, LHD with factory AC, Borg-Warner automatic gearbox, LSD, Blaupunkt Köln radio with power antenna. It was purchased directly off the show stand by a Mr. S. Tananbaum for $22,500 (nearly 3x the price of a standard DB6), whose family maintained ownership until 2017. It was displayed at the 2018 Greenwich Concours d'Elegance.

References
 L. A. Manwaring, The Observer's Book of Automobiles (12th ed., 1966), Library of Congress catalogue card 62–9807, pp. 41–43

External links
Car profile at motorbase 
Aston Martin DB6 Mark I Shooting Brake by F.L.M. Panelcraft – information from AMGE Aston Martin German Enthusiasts on www.auto-welt.info

DB6
Cars introduced in 1965
1970s cars
Rear-wheel-drive vehicles
Station wagons
Sports cars